Darisiyeh-ye Olya (also Romanized as Darīsīyeh-ye ‘Olyā; also known as Darīseh, Darīsīyeh, Darsīyeh, Derīseh, Dīrsīyeh, and Drīsīyeh) is a village in Darkhoveyn Rural District, in the Central District of Shadegan County, Khuzestan Province, Iran. At the 2006 census, its population was 596, in 86 families.

References 

Populated places in Shadegan County